Clacton Coastal Academy is a coeducational high school serving the western part of Clacton-on-Sea. The school has a population of about 1377 students with a maximum limit of 1550 students. Formerly known as "Colbayns", the site was officially renamed on 1 September 2009, after merging with the now defunct Bishops Park College. It has been part of Academies Enterprise Trust since September 2009.

History
The original school dates from 1926 but moved to its present site in 1931 when it was known as the 'Clacton-on-Sea Senior School'.  This school gained the unofficial title 'Pathfields School' because access was just off of Pathfields Road. In January 1953, a new building on the west side of Pathfields Road was opened as the 'Clacton County Secondary School for Girls' with Miss Lawrence as Headmistress. The original building on the east site became the 'Clacton County Secondary School for Boys' with Mr K. Portman as Headmaster. In September 1973 the two schools were amalgamated to form Colbayns High School under the headship of Mr. D. King. He was succeeded by Mr. J. Midgley in 1984.

Facilities
In 1988, Mr. John Holt, who joined the staff in 1964, became Headmaster. With the Governing Body, he saw the school through into successful incorporation as a Grant Maintained School within the terms of the Education Reform Act 1988 on 1 September 1993. Under his leadership, in 1996, over £1 million was spent on new facilities.

Mr. Nick Pavitt took up his post as headteacher at Easter 1997. During his first year, the school was able to put in hand £420,000 of building work through grants from the Funding Agency to build new science laboratories, language laboratories and improved sixth form study provision. A grant of a further £170,000 has allowed the building of a new Mathematics suite, completed in the Spring of 1999.

In 2009, Colbayns High School and Bishops Park merged to become the Clacton Coastal Academy.

Ofsted
The Overall Evaluation from Ofsted (2004) identified staff turn-over as a root cause of poor behaviour in the classroom.
In 2014 it was a good school.
The school has grown in recent years, particularly at Sixth Form level. In 2003, Clacton Coastal Academy became the first British school to join US-run company Edison Learning formerly known as the Edison Project.

Academics
It is possible for a student to spend all their secondary and sixth-form career at Clacton Coastal Academy, as the sixth form offer is broaden by co-operating with the University of Essex.

Key Stage 3 
The UK National Curriculum states that every pupil in Year 7 and Year 8, Key Stage 3 has a right to a broad defined curriculum.

Key Stage 4
The Curriculum is delivered as core subjects and options. It is the aim to build up a good Attainment 8 score and with it a good Progress 8 score, by choosing an EBacc combination. There is a vocational and an academic path.

Notable Former Pupils

Lord Bassam of Brighton - Labour Party (UK) politician and Shadow Minister.

References

External links
Clacton Coastal Academy

Clacton-on-Sea
Academies in Essex
Secondary schools in Essex
Academies Enterprise Trust